Hanna Zetterberg (born 15 February 1973 in Stockholm) is a former Swedish Left Party politician and member of the Riksdag 1994 – 1998.

At the age of 11, Zetterberg played the eponymous leading role in the 1984 film Ronia, the Robber's Daughter based on the children's book of the same name by Astrid Lindgren.

External links

Official website

1973 births
Living people
Actresses from Stockholm
Members of the Riksdag from the Left Party (Sweden)
Swedish film actresses
Swedish child actresses
Women members of the Riksdag
20th-century Swedish actresses
20th-century Swedish women politicians